Thomas J. Tomasso (born September 10, 1983 in Hackensack, New Jersey) is an American soccer player, who was a goalkeeper for the New England Revolution in Major League Soccer.

Tomasso played college soccer for Southern Methodist University from 2001 to 2004. In 57 starts he managed 26.5 shutouts.

He played for the New Hampshire Phantoms in 2005. On April 21, 2005 he signed a developmental contract with the New England Revolution.

On January 23, 2007 the Revolution announced that Tomasso would not be re-signing with the team. He spent some time with Michigan Stars FC of the NPSL; and several years with Canton Celtic FC, an amateur men's team in Michigan.

He spent the 2015 season playing for AFC Ann Arbor in the Great Lakes Premier League. After a successful season there, he followed coach David Hebestreit to expansion team Toledo United FC. After Toledo FC went bankrupt, Tomasso returned to AFC Ann Arbor for the 2017 season.

References

1983 births
Living people
American soccer players
AFC Ann Arbor players
Association football goalkeepers
DFW Tornados players
National Premier Soccer League players
New England Revolution players
People from Canton, Michigan
Seacoast United Phantoms players
SMU Mustangs men's soccer players
Soccer players from Michigan
USL League Two players
USL Second Division players